"Finally in Love" is a 2010 single from English singer McLean. It was released on 14 June 2010 on CD and digital download. The track has been remixed by many other British artists. It is thought that the producer of the song is Fraser T Smith.

Critical reception
Robert Copsey of Digital Spy gave the song three out of five stars, he described it as "a slick R&B ballad with lyrics as sentimental as the ending of a Richard Curtis film". He also praised the song's production stating: "Fraser T Smith's synthy production keeps things well within the confines of McLean's Brit R&B contemporaries, while a generous smattering of "hey"s and "ooh"s ensures it falls just the right side of catchy."

Track list
UK iTunes digital download
"Finally In Love"
"Finally In Love" (Camo & Krooked remix)
"Finally In Love" (M'Black rework)
"Finally In Love" (Crazy Cousinz remix)
"Finally In Love" (Champion remix)

Release history

References

2010 singles
Song recordings produced by Fraser T. Smith
2010 songs
Asylum Records singles